Atrichum is a genus of mosses belonging to the family Polytrichaceae.

The genus was first described by Palisot de Beauvois.

The genus has cosmopolitan distribution.

Species:
 Atrichum angustatum
 Atrichum crispum
 Atrichum flavisetum
 Atrichum tenellum
 Atrichum undulatum

References

Polytrichaceae
Moss genera